Chiheru de Jos is a commune in Mureș County, Transylvania, Romania. It is composed of four villages: Chiheru de Jos, Chiheru de Sus (Felsőköhér), Urisiu de Jos (Alsóoroszi), and Urisiu de Sus (Felsőoroszi).

It is located in the eastern part of the county, on the eastern edge of the Transylvanian Plateau, at the foot of the Gurghiu Mountains. The river Nadășa (also known as the Chiher) flows through the commune.

Demographics
The commune has absolute ethnic Romanian majority. According to the 2011 Census it has a population of 1,644 of which 89.05% are ethnic Romanians. Other minorities are ethnic Romani (7.42%) and ethnic Hungarians (1.64%).

See also
List of Hungarian exonyms (Mureș County)

References

Communes in Mureș County
Localities in Transylvania